Sherrick is the debut and only studio album from American soul singer and musician Sherrick, released by Warner Bros. in 1987. It was largely produced by Michael Stokes and Sherrick, except two tracks, one which was produced solely by Sherrick and another by Bobby Sandstrom and Steve Barri.

Background
Although it failed to enter the US Billboard 200 chart, Sherrick reached No. 44 on the R&B/Hip-Hop Albums Chart. In the UK, the album reached No. 27.

Singles
Five singles were released from the album. "Just Call" was the most successful single, reaching No. 8 on the Billboard Hot R&B/Hip-Hop Singles & Tracks chart, No. 26 in Ireland, and No. 23 in the UK. "Let's Be Lovers Tonight" was a UK only release which peaked at No. 63. A cover of The Originals Marvin/Anna Gaye-penned track "Baby I'm for Real" managed to peak at No. 53 on the Billboard Hot R&B/Hip-Hop Singles & Tracks chart. The next single was the US release of "Tell Me What It Is", which failed to make any charting impact, while "This Must Be Love" was released in the UK only as a promotional 12" vinyl single.

Reception

Upon release, Billboard wrote: ""Just Call" is a pop hit in the UK, boding well for crossover here. Rest of the material hews to the mainstream as well, but lingering soullessness of arrangements often offsets appeal of Sherrick's impressive vocals." The Philadelphia Inquirer commented: "This singer possesses a big, burly croon reminiscent of Teddy Pendergrass, and shares that singer's weakness - poor material. Even strong, charming singing cannot save the series of macho-man-in-love scenarios he seems to favor all too much."

In a retrospective review, Andrew Hamilton of AllMusic stated: "Sherrick's only solo shot displayed the problematic singer's compelling way with words, music, and writing skills. His strong tenor caresses and entices on "Just Call" and a strong rendition of "Baby I'm for Real". Mike Stokes and Sherrick contributed the bulk of the original songs that speak of love, love, and more love."

Track listing

Charts
Album

Singles
Just Call

Let's Be Lovers Tonight

Baby I'm for Real

Personnel 
 Producers – Michael Stokes (tracks 1-6, 8), Sherrick (tracks 1-6, 8, 9), Bobby Sandstrom (track 7), Steve Barri (track 7)
 Executive Producer – Benny Medina, Ray Singleton
 Mastering – Brian Gardner
 Rhythm Arrangements Arrangement - Michael Stokes (tracks 1-6, 8, 9), Sherrick (tracks 1-6, 8, 9), Richard Elliot (track 7)
 String Arrangements – Gene Page, Sherrick
 Vocal Arrangements – Sherrick
 Art Direction, Logo Design – Kav Deluxe
 Clothing For G.H.Q. (cover photography) – Axis
 Hair (cover photography) – Alison Greenpalm, Toni Greene
 Make-Up (cover photography) – Tara Posey
 Nails (cover photography) – Renee
 Photography – Jeff Katz

References

1987 debut albums
Warner Records albums